Hasan Sultan was khan of Shaki. His reign period is not much known. According to a Persian source he was of House of Black Monk.

He was attacked by Levan of Kakheti in 1521. Levan was soon punished by Ismail I who sent his troops under command of Div Sultan Rumlu. He was assassinated in 1524.

References 

1524 deaths
Khans
Year of birth unknown
Place of birth unknown
1497 births
Shaki Khanate